The Puerto Rico Science, Technology and Research Trust is a private non-profit organization created in 2004 to encourage and promote innovation, transfer and commercialization of technology and creation of jobs in the technology sector, based in San Juan, Puerto Rico.

The Trust is instrumental in setting Puerto Rico's public policy for science, technology, research and development.

The Trust provides funding to new small businesses that have a technology-based business plan.

The Trust has helped inventors get their patents issued.

The director of the Puerto Rico Science, Technology and Research Transfer Office, as of 2019, is David Gulley. The goal of the Transfer office is to help Puerto Rico monetize science.

References

External links
 Puerto Rico Science, Technology and Research Trust official site

2004 establishments in Puerto Rico
Organizations established in 2004
Research institutes in Puerto Rico
Charitable trusts
San Juan, Puerto Rico